Nalagasdeniya is a small village in Hikkaduwa Divisional Secretary's Area in Galle District of Southern Province of Sri Lanka.

External links
 Geographic Co-ordinates

Populated places in Southern Province, Sri Lanka